In enzymology, a 2,1-fructan:2,1-fructan 1-fructosyltransferase is an enzyme that catalyzes the chemical reaction

[beta-D-fructosyl-(2->1)-]m + [beta-D-fructosyl-(2->1)-]n  [beta-D-fructosyl-(2->1)-]m-1 + [beta-D-fructosyl-(2->1)-]n+1

Thus, the two substrates of this enzyme are [[[beta-D-fructosyl-(2->1)-]]m]] and [[beta-D-fructosyl-(2->1)-]]n]], whereas its two products are [[beta-D-fructosyl-(2->1)-]]m-1]] and [[beta-D-fructosyl-(2->1)-]]n+1]].

This enzyme belongs to the family of glycosyltransferases, specifically the hexosyltransferases.  The systematic name of this enzyme class is 2,1-beta-D-fructan:2,1-beta-D-fructan 1-beta-D-fructosyltransferase. Other names in common use include 1,2-beta-D-fructan 1F-fructosyltransferase, fructan:fructan fructosyl transferase, FFT, 1,2-beta-fructan 1F-fructosyltransferase, 1,2-beta-D-fructan:1,2-beta-D-fructan, 1F-beta-D-fructosyltransferase, and fructan:fructan 1-fructosyl transferase.

References

 
 

EC 2.4.1
Enzymes of unknown structure